The 1999–2000 Edmonton Oilers season was the Oilers' 21st season in the NHL, and they were coming off a 33–37–12 record in 1998–99, earning their third-straight playoff appearance. However, they were defeated in the first round by the eventual Western Conference Champions, the Dallas Stars.

The Oilers did not bring back Head Coach Ron Low, who had been with the team since 1995, and hired former Oilers defenceman Kevin Lowe as his replacement. Lowe played with Edmonton from 1979 to 1992, and then again from 1996 to 1998, winning five Stanley Cups with the team, and scored the first NHL goal in Oilers history.

Edmonton saw its win total drop to 32; however, it earned 88 points, the team's highest point total since the Stanley Cup-winning 1989–90 season, and qualified for the playoffs for the fourth-straight season, finishing in seventh place in the Western Conference.

Offensively, newly named captain Doug Weight rebounded from his injury-plagued 1998–99 season and led the club with 51 assists and 72 points. Ryan Smyth was the Oilers' goal-scoring leader, with 28 goals. Alexander Selivanov scored 27 goals and 47 points in his first full season with the Oilers, while Bill Guerin scored 24 goals. Defenceman Roman Hamrlik led the blueline with 45 points, while second-year player Tom Poti scored nine goals and earned 35 points. Sean Brown led the club in penalty minutes once again, with 192.

In goal, Tommy Salo got the bulk of the action, winning 27 games, while recording a goals against average (GAA) of 2.33, earning two shutouts along the way.

The Oilers opened the playoffs against the Dallas Stars, the fourth-straight season that these teams faced each other. The Stars finished in second place in the Western Conference with 102 points, 14 points higher than the Oilers. The Stars earned a 2–0 series lead by winning both games in Dallas; however, the Oilers cut the lead in half with a 5–2 victory in Game 3 at Skyreach Centre. Dallas won Game 4 by a 4–3 score, earning them a 3–1 then they finished off the series in Game 5 in Dallas, ending the Oilers' season for the third year in a row.

Season standings

Schedule and results

Playoffs

Season stats

Scoring leaders

Goaltending

Playoff stats

Scoring leaders

Goaltending

Awards and records

Awards

Milestones

Transactions

Trades

Free agents

Draft picks
Edmonton's draft picks at the 1999 NHL Entry Draft

References
 SHRP Sports
 The Internet Hockey Database
 National Hockey League Guide & Record Book 2007

Edmonton Oilers seasons, 1999-2000
Edmon
Edmonton Oilers seasons